The ruined castle of Châteauneuf-sur-Epte is in the commune of Château-sur-Epte in the Eure department of France.

Building was begun  in 1097 by William Rufus, King of England, to reinforce the frontier along the Epte River. The castle occupied a site on the border between the Duchy of Normandy and the Kingdom of France. It was reinforced by the Plantagenets in the 12th century and again during the Hundred Years' War.
 
The castle was constructed from limestone and was founded in the second half of the 11th century by William Rufus, King of England. In 1119, it was besieged by Louis VI of France (Louis le Gros or Louis the Fat). In the 12th century, it was restored and reinforced by Henry II of England (keep and entry). Other works were carried out in the 14th century. In 1437, it was captured by John Talbot, 1st Earl of Shrewsbury.

The castle's role declined in the 16th century and it was ordered to be dismantled by Mazarin in 1647. Transformed into an agricultural centre under the Ancien Régime, it comprised a motte with a stone keep, a lower court linked to the motte and defended by a curtain wall flanked in the east and west by two fortified gateways (14th century), a drawbridge and, in the lower court, a medieval barn, a 17th-century corps de logis and a dovecote. The condition of the site deteriorated.

The ruins are private property. It has been listed since 1926 as a monument historique by the French Ministry of Culture.

See also
List of castles in France

References

External links
 
 

1097 establishments in Europe
1090s establishments in France
11th-century fortifications
Castles in Eure
Ruined castles in Normandy
Motte-and-bailey castles
Monuments historiques of Eure
William II of England